The Tanfield Group, formerly Comeleon, has changed its main focus from automotive components and imaging equipment to electric vehicle manufacturing and specialist engineering. As Comeleon, the company made 3D images for mobile phones and other devices, but saw the bottom drop out of its key handset market in 2003. In 2004, Comeleon was absorbed by the Tanfield Group. The company has since expanded to include electric vehicles and aerial work platforms.

The group is made up of the following companies:

 Aerial Access
 Jumbotugs
 Norquip
 SEV Materials Handling 
 Smith Electric Vehicles
 Snorkel International
 UpRight Powered Access
 Tanfield Engineering Systems Ltd

Snorkel
On 28 June 2007, the company acquired Snorkel International as another division of its Aerial Work Platform (AWP) market share.

TX4E 
London Taxis International, which manufactures the London black taxi in Coventry, has signed a development agreement with electric vehicle manufacturer Tanfield to develop an all-electric  urban taxi.

Smith Electric Vehicles
Smith Electric Vehicles was formed in England in 1920. Originally specialising in trolly busses under the name Northern Coachbuilders Ltd. Over the next 80 years the company developed a plethora of vehicles including milk floats.

Tanfield Group Plc acquired the company in October 2004, for £2.2m and 1 million new ordinary shares. Tanfield immediately re-started R&D work to develop new electric delivery vehicles. Including the Newton and Edison .

Tanfield announced the formation of Smith Electric Vehicles US Corp (Smith US) in February 2009 and the company opened for business later that year.

In March 2010 Smith US made a £37m conditional offer, equating to 50p per Tanfield share, plus a "free" share in Smith US if it subsequently undergoes an IPO and joins the stock market in the near future.

Controversy
On 3 July 2008 it was announced in the press that the London Stock Exchange was launching a probe after a collapse in the share price. The company was criticised by analysts for poor standards of disclosure and weak financial controls.  The shares reached a high of 203.5p (valuing the Company at over £700 million) in July 2007 and fell to 5.53 pence (a value of £20 million). In April 2008, its annual results disappointed the City and raised questions about its disclosure standards and the high level of cash burn.

References

External links

 Aerial Access
 Jumbotugs
 Norquip
 SEV Materials Handling 
 Snorkel International
 UpRight Powered Access
 Tanfield Engineering Systems Ltd
 Smith Electric Vehicles

Automotive companies of the United Kingdom
Companies listed on the Alternative Investment Market
Electric vehicle manufacturers of the United Kingdom